Ronnie Larsen is a playwright and film director specializing in writing plays about sex.

His play Making Porn was about the gay porn industry in the 1980s, and the production was notable for casting gay porn actors. Productions have starred Blue Blake, Rex Chandler and Ryan Idol.

In 1997 Larsen made a documentary about the gay porn industry entitled Shooting Porn. It is not a filmed version of the play Making Porn. The film featured figures from the gay pornography industry including Gino Colbert, Chi Chi LaRue, Blue Blake, Adam Rom, Rip Stone and Adam Wilde.

Plays produced
1994 Scenes From My Love Life
 1995 Making Porn
1996 Talk Show later to be titled Sleeping with Straight Men 
 1998 Peep Show
 2002 10 Naked Men

Reviews
New York Times critic Stephen Holden found the film Shooting Porn to be "disappointingly frivolous," characterizing it as "coyly unrevealing" and a "shallow, titillating look" at its subject.

References

External links
 

LGBT film directors
Year of birth missing (living people)
Living people
American male dramatists and playwrights
American LGBT dramatists and playwrights
American documentary film directors